Jiwu Huang from the Shenzhen University, Shenzhen, China was named Fellow of the Institute of Electrical and Electronics Engineers (IEEE) in 2016 for contributions to multimedia data hiding and forensics.

References

Fellow Members of the IEEE
Living people
Year of birth missing (living people)
Place of birth missing (living people)
Academic staff of Shenzhen University